Pleckstrin homology domain-containing family A member 5 is a protein that in humans is encoded by the PLEKHA5 gene.

References

Further reading

External links